Emilcin Abduction was a supposed alien abduction of farmer, Jan Wolski in May 1978. There was little media attention at the time. A monument was subsequently erected in Emilcin, Poland, at the site where the abduction is said to have taken place.

Background 
The two beings jumped onto Wolski's cart and, according to Wolski, sat next to him and started to speak in a strange language. Originally he had mistaken them for foreigners because of their "slanted eyes and prominent cheekbones." Wolski drove his cart, with the two beings aboard, to a clearing where he says a large object was hovering.

The craft 
There were no notable external features of the craft (i.e. lights, joints, etc.). Wolski mentioned that there were four objects on the craft made of a black material that appeared to be drill-like in appearance, which generated a humming sound. An elevator-like platform attached to the hovering craft descended to the ground. (Artist's Rendition)

Wolski then claims that he was taken aboard the ship with two additional entities he met near the flying object. He was then gestured to "undress" (take off his clothes). There were about eight or ten benches situated around the craft, each the size for one person to sit in. There were some rooks in front of the door which was moving its legs and wings but seemed to be immobilized. Wolski claims that he was then examined with a tool that resembled two dishes or "saucers." After this, he was ordered to redress, and it was then that he noticed there were no lights or windows on the craft, only the daylight coming through the craft's door. Entities ate and offered him something like icicles but he refused. The craft's interior was described as black with a greyish tint, similar to that of the creatures' outfits.

Aftermath 
Afterwards, Wolski returned home to his family and notified them of what had just happened, urging them to come see the floating craft. He notified his sons who called to other neighbours, and together they went to investigate the site. The grass where the craft had been had signs of usage in it, being "trodden down covered with dew and paths coming in all directions." Wolski returned home, leaving the rest of the neighbours and family at the site. Wolski's sons claim that there were footprints left behind by the beings, though they did not detail whether the footprints were larger or smaller than their own.

A six-year-old boy claims to have witnessed a bus-like craft hover over a barn, then climb high into the sky and vanish.

Wolski explained these memories in an interview with Henryk Pomorski and Krystyna Adamczyk in July 1978, two months following the incident. The audio tape of the interview was kept in a private archive for a long time before being released to the public.

Memorial 
The text in Polish, read: "On 10 May 1978 in Emilcin a UFO object landed. The truth will astonish us in the future".

Media portrayals
The incident in Emilcin was the subject of several books and short television documentaries in Poland. A short comic book about the event, titled Przybysze (The Visitors), drawn by Grzegorz Rosiński and written by Henryk Kurta, was published in 1978.

See also
List of UFO sightings
UFO

References

External links
 "UFO Casebook: Jan Wolski, 30th Anniversary"
 "UFO Digest: Jan Wolski, 30th Anniversary"
 The Emilcin Incident: A Polish Encounter of the Fourth Kind

Alien abduction reports
1978 in Poland
Polish folklore
May 1978 events in Europe
Opole Lubelskie County